Michael Christopher Hill (born 22 October 1964) is a male English former javelin thrower who was born in Leeds, West Yorkshire.

Athletics career
Hill won a bronze medal at the 1993 World Championships and a silver medal at the 1998 European Championships. He represented Great Britain at four Olympic Games and competed in over 20 major championships between 1983 and 2002, only failing to reach the final twice. He has since coached heptathlete Jessica Ennis.

He is also a four-time Commonwealth Games medallist. He represented England and won a silver medal, at the 1986 Commonwealth Games in Edinburgh, Scotland. Four years later he represented England and won another silver, at the 1990 Commonwealth Games in Auckland, New Zealand. A third silver medal was won when he represented England at the 1994 Commonwealth Games in Victoria, British Columbia, Canada before he won his first medal of a different colour, winning a bronze medal for England, at the 1998 Commonwealth Games in Kuala Lumpur, Malaysia.

Achievements

Seasonal bests by year
1986 - 78.56
1987 - 85.24
1988 - 81.30
1989 - 82.56
1990 - 82.38
1991 - 84.12
1992 - 85.32
1993 - 86.94
1994 - 86.36
1995 - 84.14
1996 - 81.42
1997 - 86.54
1998 - 86.92
1999 - 84.94
2000 - 83.71
2001 - 84.88
2002 - 82.90
2003 - 78.73
2004 - 80.46

References

External links 
 
 

British male javelin throwers
1964 births
Living people
Sportspeople from Leeds
Athletes (track and field) at the 1988 Summer Olympics
Athletes (track and field) at the 1992 Summer Olympics
Athletes (track and field) at the 1996 Summer Olympics
Athletes (track and field) at the 2000 Summer Olympics
Olympic athletes of Great Britain
Athletes (track and field) at the 1986 Commonwealth Games
Athletes (track and field) at the 1990 Commonwealth Games
Athletes (track and field) at the 1994 Commonwealth Games
Athletes (track and field) at the 1998 Commonwealth Games
Commonwealth Games silver medallists for England
Commonwealth Games bronze medallists for England
World Athletics Championships medalists
European Athletics Championships medalists
World Athletics Championships athletes for Great Britain
Commonwealth Games medallists in athletics
Medallists at the 1986 Commonwealth Games
Medallists at the 1990 Commonwealth Games
Medallists at the 1994 Commonwealth Games
Medallists at the 1998 Commonwealth Games